The .410 calibre is one of the smallest caliber of shotgun shell commonly available (along with the 9mm Flobert rimfire cartridge, and the less common .22 rimfire shot shell). A .410 bore shotgun loaded with shot shells is well suited for small game hunting and pest control. The .410 started off in the UK as a garden gun along with the .360 and the No. 3 bore (9 mm) rimfire, No. 2 bore (7 mm) rimfire, and No. 1 bore (6 mm) rimfire. .410 shells have similar base dimensions to the .45 Colt cartridge, allowing many single-shot firearms, as well as some derringers and revolvers chambered in that caliber, to fire .410 shot shells without any modifications.

Origin

Lancaster's pattern centerfire and pinfire .410 shot cartridges first appeared in Eley Brothers Ltd. flysheets in 1857. By 1874, Eleys were advertising modern centerfire .410 cartridges. It appears to have become popular around 1900, although it was recommended as "suited to the requirements of naturalists, garden guns and for such weapons as walking-stick guns", presumably for self-defense, in 1892 by W. W. Greener.  The first ammunition was 2.0 inches (50.8 mm) long, compared with the modern 2.5 (63.5 mm) and  sizes. Aluminum shells are available but are not reloadable, as are paper or plastic shells. Full length brass shells can be found and are reloadable. Brass shells can be made from .444 Marlin rifle cartridges, and these are reloadable .
 

Shotguns in .410 loaded with shot shells are well suited for small game hunting and pest control; including rabbits, squirrels, snakes, rats, and birds. A .410 loaded with 1/4 ounce slugs is effective against larger animals such as coyotes and deer.

While a .410 is inferior to the traditional 12-gauge shotshell for defensive use, a number of companies market defensive guns chambered in .410, such as the Mossberg 500 Home Security Model shotgun, the Smith & Wesson Governor revolver, and the Taurus Judge revolver. Defensive ammunition such as buckshot, slugs and combination loads are common. American Derringer and Winchester market ammunition loaded with five 000 buckshot pellets in  shells and three pellets in  shells. Combination shells such as Winchester Supreme Elite .410 shells are loaded with three 71 grain disks and twelve BB pellets.

Survival arms

The small size of the .410 bore makes it popular for use in compact firearms carried for emergency use. These are often combination guns, with a .22 Hornet or .22 rimfire rifle barrel mounted over a .410 bore shotgun barrel.

The Snake Charmer is a .410 gauge, stainless steel, single shot, break-action shotgun, with an exposed hammer, an  barrel, black molded plastic furniture and a short thumb-hole butt-stock that holds four additional  shotgun shells. They are commonly used by gardeners and farmers for pest control. It originally sold for $89.95 and was marketed as a general purpose utility shotgun "perfect" for "fishing - hunting - camping - back packing - survival - home defense - truck or Jeep gun".

The Savage Model 24 is an American-made, over and under, combination gun, manufactured by Savage Arms. It may also be disassembled for ease of stowage. Its predecessor was made by Stevens and sported a tenite stock and forearm. In WWII, 15,000 were ordered and issued in air crew survival kits for Army Air Force bomber crews to be used as survival arms in the event they were shot down.

The M6 aircrew survival weapon was made for the US Air Force, with a .22 Hornet rifle barrel mounted over a .410 bore shotgun barrel and was first issued in the Korean War. The military also lists an aluminum .410  shell, with a rifle primer, as standard issue under the ammunition inventory name M-35. The civilian version Springfield Armory M6 Scout has a .22 rimfire or .22 Hornet over a .410 bore shotgun barrel.  The original M6 has a  barrel, the same length as the stock, and folds in half for storage, making a compact package. With the short barrel, this is legally classified as an any other weapon in the United States, so the M6 Scout is made with  barrels for civilian sales. Special flare cartridges in .410 were issued with the USAF model.

Handguns and shot pistols
The fact that the .410 bore shell fits in a .45 Colt chamber has resulted in some unusual applications.  While shotguns are often limited in minimum length, a firearm chambered in .45 Colt, such as the Contender pistol, is not defined as a shotgun even though it can chamber shotgun shells. In the UK, .410 shot-pistols are used around pheasant pens to kill rats where a full-length shotgun would be inappropriate.

The Thompson Center Arms Contender pistols are commonly encountered with a special .45 Colt/.410 bore barrel. The barrel is rifled for the .45 Colt, but has a special choke and vent rib to make it function as a shotgun. Due to the rifled barrel, the assembled firearm is considered a rifle or pistol (depending on barrel length) and thus is not subject to the National Firearms Act's  minimum barrel length.  Nonetheless, possession of a Thompson Center Arms .45/.410 pistol barrel is illegal in California, for both dealers and individuals, and such a barrel may not legally be shipped into the state, or even taken into California for a hunting trip, by reason of it being classified as a short barreled shotgun (SBSG) when used with a Contender receiver.

American Derringer has long offered .45 Colt-.410 bore Derringers.
Bond Arms also offers various Derringer models which chamber both .45 Colt cartridges and .410 shotshell.

Also, Taurus, Magnum Research, and Smith & Wesson offer revolvers with extended cylinders, long enough to hold .410 shells as well. Magnum Research offers a single-action revolver in their BFR (big frame revolver) line, while the Taurus Judge is similar in price to their other double-action revolvers, with the Raging Judge model capable of chambering and firing the .454 Casull cartridge. The Smith & Wesson Governor is a double-action revolver also capable of firing .45 Colt as well as .45 ACP cartridges with the aid of moon clips. The discontinued MIL Thunder 5 is also chambered in .410-bore. Over the years, a large number of devices have been made that will convert larger-gauge shotguns to accept .410 shotgun shells.

Capacity, compared to other gauges

Most shotgun cartridges are measured in terms of shotgun gauge. Shotgun gauge is determined by the weight of a round lead ball that is sized to fit into its barrel.  For example, the barrel of a 12-gauge shotgun is equal to the diameter of a one-twelfth/pound lead ball (0.729 in) and a 20-gauge can fit a one-twentieth/pound lead ball (0.615 in).  Using this method a .410 bore is equivalent to a (hypothetical) 67-gauge.

References

External links

 The Shotgun Report review of the Remington 870 in 28 gauge and .410 bore
 The .410 Bore by Chuck Hawks

Shotgun shells